Ramsø was a municipality (Danish kommune) in the former Roskilde County on the island of Zealand (Sjælland) in east Denmark until 1 January 2007. Its last mayor was Poul Lindor Nielsen, a member of the Social Democrats (Socialdemokraterne) political party. The main town and the site of its municipal council was Viby. Other towns and villages in the municipality were Gadstrup, Skalstrup, Snoldelev and Ørsted.

 Dåstrup Parish
 Gadstrup Parish
 Snoldelev Parish
 Syv Parish
 Ørsted Parish

Ramsø municipality ceased to exist as the result of the Kommunalreformen ("Municipality Reform") of 2007. The new municipality belongs to Region Sjælland ("Zealand Region").

See also
Snoldelev Stone

References

External links 
 Roskile municipality's official website (Danish)

Former municipalities of Denmark